{{DISPLAYTITLE:Methyl-α-D-galactose}}

Methyl-α-D-galactose is a constituent of Eleutherococcus senticosus.

References 

Galactose
Monosaccharide derivatives